The Company of Biologists is a UK-based charity and not-for-profit publisher that was established in 1925 by George Parker Bidder III with the aim of promoting research and study across all branches of biology. The company publishes currently five scientific journals: Development, Disease Models & Mechanisms, Journal of Cell Science, Journal of Experimental Biology, and Biology Open.

As part of its charitable giving, the company awards grants and travelling fellowships to biologists as well as running a series of workshops.

The company's current chairman is Professor Matthew Freeman, FRS.

Brief history
George Parker Bidder III, a prominent zoologist working in Europe during the late 19th and early 20th centuries, founded the Company of Biologists in 1925 in a bid to rescue the ailing journal The British Journal of Experimental Biology (now The Journal of Experimental Biology), which was founded in 1923 by Julian Huxley, Lancelot Hogben and Frances A. E. Crew.

Bidder felt that the journal was crucial for this emerging area of biology so turned to friends and colleagues, selling them £5 shares in his newly formed Company of Biologists.  Such was the company’s success that, in 1946, Bidder gifted the Quarterly Journal of Microscopical Science to them, which was later relaunched as Journal of Cell Science.

In 1952 the company became a registered charity and a year later, in 1953, it accepted the gift of a third journal, the Journal of Embryology and Experimental Morphology (relaunched in 1987 as Development).

In August 2008 Disease Models & Mechanisms was launched to reflect the increasing importance of model organisms in the understanding of human disease; it is an open access journal.

In autumn 2011, the company launched a fifth journal, Biology Open, an online only, open access that publishes original research across all aspects of the biological sciences.

The company’s charitable status has the condition that none of the directors receive any remuneration for their services, so directors give their time and expertise as part of their contribution to the scientific community.

The company seal
The company seal features two Egyptian symbols that also appeared in the company’s previous logo. The well-known ankh is the Egyptian hieroglyph for life – an appropriate symbol for an organization dedicated to supporting the life sciences. The feather represents the goddess Maat and is generally seen as the symbol for truth, balance and order – Maat weighed souls against her feather to determine whether they would reach the paradise of the afterlife.

Charitable activities
The company provides grants to many scientific societies, large and small. These societies, in turn, use part of the funding to provide travel grants to support postgraduates and junior postdoctoral fellows who wish to attend their conferences.  Each of the company’s journals provides travelling fellowships to postgraduate students and postdoctoral fellows and these are put towards the cost of collaborative visits to other research laboratories. The company also invites direct applications from postgraduate and postdoctoral fellows for travel grants towards the cost of attendance at research conferences, workshops or for skill-acquiring visits to other research labs.

As participants in the United Nation’s Health InterNetwork Access to Research Initiative (HINARI) and OARE initiatives, the company makes all its online articles freely available to users in developing countries

In 2010, the company launched its series of workshops intended to champion the novel techniques and innovations that will underpin the post-genomic revolution.

Community sites 
The Company of Biologists supports three online biological communities:

 the Node: the community site for and by developmental biologists
 preLights: the preprint highlights service run by the biological community
 FocalPlane: the community site for microscopists and biologists alike

Further reading
Erlingsson, Steindór J., Institutions and innovation: experimental zoology and the creation of the British Journal of Experimental Biology and the Society for Experimental Biology, British Journal for the History of Science, 46(1): 72-95, 2013.

External links

Workshops
Charity

Biology organisations based in the United Kingdom
Learned societies of the United Kingdom
1925 establishments in the United Kingdom
Non-profit academic publishers
Organizations established in 1925